S.O.C.O.: Scene of the Crime Operatives also known as SOCO was a Philippine investigative docudrama program broadcast on ABS-CBN. Hosted by Gus Abelgas, it premiered from November 23, 2005, to October 17, 2020. The program primarily aims to find answers to serious crimes with the help of forensic investigators and the local police.

Overview 
The program originally aired on Friday late nights before it was eventually transferred to Saturday afternoons in July 2012.

On March 21 to May 2, 2020, S.O.C.O. was temporarily suspended when it temporarily stopped airing new episodes due to the quarantine caused by the COVID-19 pandemic and ABS-CBN stopped its free-to-air broadcast operations as ordered by the National Telecommunications Commission (NTC) due to the lapsing of the network's legislative franchise. As a result, the program released new episodes through its social media accounts.

On June 13, 2020, the program returned via pay television network Kapamilya Channel until it's conclusion on October 17 to give way to the third season of I Can See Your Voice.

S.O.C.O. is also aired on DZMM TeleRadyo initially as first-run on September 8, 2011, every Thursday at 9:15 PM. This edition ran for eleven months until July 6, 2012. On April 20, 2017, the program returned to DZMM TeleRadyo as a rerun of its previous episodes, which airs every Thursday at 2:00 PM and Friday at 1:00 AM.

Radio program
S.O.C.O. sa DZMM is also aired every Saturdays at 6:00 PM to 7:30 PM on DZMM Radyo Patrol 630 and DZMM TeleRadyo. The program is anchored by Gus Abelgas and David Oro.

Accolades

See also
 List of programs broadcast by ABS-CBN

References

External links 
 
 
 

ABS-CBN original programming
ABS-CBN News and Current Affairs shows
2010s Philippine television series
2020s Philippine television series
2005 Philippine television series debuts
2020 Philippine television series endings
Investigative journalism
Philippine documentary television series
Philippine crime television series
Philippine television docudramas
Filipino-language television shows